Terra Linda High School (also known as TLHS and more commonly known as TL) is a public secondary school located in Terra Linda, San Rafael, California, United States. In 2006, it was named a California Distinguished School. The school is part of the San Rafael City Schools school district. The official school mascot is the Trojan.

History
Terra Linda High School was established in 1960 in its current location on 320 Nova Albion Way.

News 

 In 2022, a Terra Linda teacher was arrested during class for being under the influence of alcohol, marijuana, and prescription drugs. A screening test showed that her blood-alcohol level was three times the legal limit.

Athletics
In 2004, Terra Linda High School's varsity football team was the NCS 2A Redwood Empire Football Champion. In 2018, the varsity football team won the MCAL title and won their first round NCS game against Pinole Valley High School.

Terra Linda Football dominated the MCAL under Coach Don Lucas from 1966 to 1980; winning ten league titles and the NCS 3A division in 1979 and 1980.  The '79 team featured a veer offense and a stout 4-3 defense that allowed only 2 touchdowns all year.  The 1980 Trojans did a repeat and won the NCS 3A Championship against El Molino on Quagmire Bailey Field in Santa Rosa.

The men's soccer program won the 2014 NCS title, the 2015-16 MCAL title and 2019-20 MCAL title.

The women's golf team won the 2017, 2018, and 2019 MCAL titles.

Demographics
2019–2020
1,361 students: 741 male (54.4%), 620 female (45.6%)

Notable alumni
Bill "Spaceman" Lee, professional baseball player
Debrah Farentino, actress known for her role in the soap opera Capitol 
David Haskell, actor know for his performance in Godspell
Scott Trimble, a location scout known for his work on Iron Man 2
Pete McRae, rock guitarist
Rick DeMont, winner of the men's 400 meter freestyle at the 1972 Summer Olympics
Stacey Bailey, NFL wide receiver
Barry O'Brien, writer and producer best known for creating the popular Disney channel show Hannah Montana.
Daniel Andreas San Diego, suspected terrorist
Joe Ayoob, world record holder for longest paper airplane throw

References

External links
Terra Linda High School
San Francisco Chronicle article about Terra Linda High Trojans

High schools in Marin County, California
Public high schools in California
Education in San Rafael, California
Buildings and structures in San Rafael, California
1960 establishments in California